John O'Gaunt, (properly John O' Gaunt) is a small village in the English county of Leicestershire.
 The population of the village is included in the civil parish of Twyford and Thorpe

Etymology 
The area takes its name from the former John O' Gaunt railway station which took its name from a covert known to local hunters some distance away.

Governance 
John O'Gaunt is in the civil parish of Somerby which, in turn, is part of the district of Melton.

References 

Hamlets in Leicestershire
Borough of Melton